Deucalion and Pyrrha is a 1636–1637 oil sketch by Peter Paul Rubens, now in the Museo del Prado. It is a sketch for a lost painting by Jan Cossiers - that painting was commissioned for the Torre de la Parada.

External links

Paintings depicting Greek myths
1630s paintings
Mythological paintings by Peter Paul Rubens